Cape Cornwall (meaning "goose back") is a small headland in West Cornwall, UK. It is four miles north of Land's End near the town of St Just. Until the first Ordnance Survey in the early 19th century, Cape Cornwall was believed to be the most westerly point in Cornwall.

Most of the headland is owned by the National Trust. National Coastwatch has a look-out on the seaward side. The only tourist infrastructure at present is a car park (owned by the National Trust), public toilets, and a refreshments counter during the summer.

The Brisons, two offshore rocks, are located approximately one mile southwest of Cape Cornwall. They mark the starting line of the annual swimming race ending at Priest Cove.

Etymology
The name Cape Cornwall appeared first on a maritime chart around the year 1600. The original Cornish name, Kilgoodh Ust, dates back to 1580. In English it translates to "goose-back at St Just", a reference to the shape of the cape. Later versions of the name dropped the 'Ust'. An alternative name, Pen Kernow, is a recent translation back to Cornish of the English.

A cape is the point of land where two bodies of water meet. Cape Cornwall is one of only two capes in the United Kingdom, the other being Cape Wrath in North West Scotland.

Early history

Pottery found in cists on the Cape have been dated to the Late Bronze Age. The presence of another cliff castle nearby (Kenidjack) may indicate that the area was important in the Iron Age. On the landward side of the Cape is the remains of the medieval St Helen’s Oratory, which replaced a 6th-century church. A font now installed in the porch of St Just church may be from this building.

19th century to present

Cape Cornwall Mine, a tin mine on the cape, was operated intermittently between 1838 and 1883. The mine's 1864 chimney near the peak of the cape was retained as an aid to navigation. In the early 20th century the former ore dressing floors were for a time converted for use as greenhouses and wineries.

In 1987 the mine site was purchased by the H. J. Heinz Company of the United States (and British plants) and donated to the nation. The remains of Cape Cornwall Mine are designated as part of the Cornwall and West Devon Mining Landscape, a UNESCO World Heritage Site.

References

External links

 Cape Cornwall at DMOZ

National Trust properties in Cornwall
Headlands of Cornwall
Penwith
St Just in Penwith